Police court may refer to:

 Police Court (film), a 1932 American film
 Police tribunal (France) (Tribunal de police), the lowest level of criminal court in France
 Police tribunal (Belgium) (Politierechtbank/Tribunal de police), the lowest level of criminal court in Belgium
 Magistrates' court (England and Wales), formerly known in larger towns as a police court, the lowest level of court in England and Wales
 The lowest level of court in many other common law jurisdictions